St. Dominic Catholic Secondary School is a high school in Bracebridge, Ontario, Canada that serves all students from the Muskoka and Parry Sound area.  Opened in 1995, the school campus has seen several stages of expansion to accommodate the school's growth in programming and population. St. Dominic C.S.S. is part of the Simcoe Muskoka Catholic District School Board.

History 

The school has grown from humble beginnings of a vision of Catholic education for students in Muskoka and Parry Sound to a thriving community partner with many co-circulars for students to enjoy along with providing strong academic foundations to prepare students for the workplace, college and university environments.

In 2014, the Simcoe Muskoka Catholic District School Board invested in the school's one-to-one technology initiative which provided every student with an opportunity to use a Chromebook for the school year. Students now use technology on a daily basis which keeps their learning current and tailored to their learning needs.

Specialist High Skills Major Program 
 Construction - This Specialist High Skills Major (SHSM) is offered to students in Grades 11 & 12.   Students who choose this pathway select 9 of their 16 courses that relate to Construction in their final 2 years of secondary school.  During this time students receive industry-specific certification and coop related work placements.  Students also work on off-site projects as a class to help erect projects in the community like sheds, gazebos, greenhouses and community gardens.
 Hospitality - Students learn valuable hands-on food preparation skills to prepare them for the thriving service industry found in resorts across Muskoka and Parry Sound.
 Non-Profit - This SHSM pathway enables students to build a foundation of "sector-focused" knowledge and skills before graduating. The program seeks to develop skills in the areas of "cooperation, ethical values, consciousness, and citizenship" along with problem-solving and team building approaches to real-world needs. Students will study both local and international issues while seeking to promote action within the community and abroad.
 HOCKEY CANADA SKILLS ACADEMY - In September 2016, St. Dominic C.S.S. began offering the innovative Hockey Canada Skills Academy (HCSA) for Grade 9 and 10 students. Students can choose the program as part of their course selection and receive two physical education credits, while at the same time improving their individual and technical hockey skills. The program emphasizes hockey skills as well as fitness, nutrition and leadership. Students will be provided with dry land and on ice training, elite-level coaching from lead instructor Mr. Dan Blum, as well as the opportunity to take part in several other community involvement programs. This Hockey Canada program is only available to St. Dominic Catholic Secondary School students. An application is required to join the program.

Teams and clubs 

St. Dominic offers a full complement of athletic team sports as well as several school clubs.

Teams include volleyball, basketball, soccer, badminton, and cross-country along with several other major team sports.  Team coaches are committed to building teams that understand the fundamentals of working together to succeed and enjoying sports as an integral part of education.
 
Clubs include Yearbook, Coding Club, Robotics Club, among various others which are highly regarded among particular groups of students.

Community involvement 
Spanish exchange history
Murals (including for Bracebridge's  "Fire and Ice" festival)
Greenhouse
The Pines
"Santa's Workshop" - A program run by the SDCSS Construction Technology classes whereas younger students and the less fortunate receive handmade toys from the shop students.

See also
List of high schools in Ontario

References

External links 
 St. Dominic Catholic Secondary School Homepage
 Simcoe Muskoka Catholic District School Board
 St. Dominic Twitter Feed

Bracebridge, Ontario
High schools in the District Municipality of Muskoka
Catholic secondary schools in Ontario
Educational institutions established in 1995
1995 establishments in Ontario